"Scars" is a song recorded by South Korean boy band Stray Kids. It was released on October 13, 2021, as a double A-side Japanese second single together with the Japanese version of "Thunderous", through Epic Records Japan. Written by 3Racha, KM-Markit, and Armadillo, it shows the group's determination to continue to make deep and large scars to grasp a bigger dream even though they have a lot of them. The song peaked at number two on both Oricon Singles Chart, and Billboard Japan Hot 100, selling over 180,000 copies in the first week in Japan. The Korean version of "Scars" was released on December 23 as a lead single of their second compilation album SKZ2021.

Background and release

On July 30, 2021, Stray Kids announced the release of their second Japanese single on October 13, with five physical editions: three first press limited (A, B, C), regular, and FC. The group counted down to announce the single's title and details from September 3 to 8 with individual concept photos. They announce the title on September 9, called "Scars" and the Japanese version of "Thunderous", as a double A-side single, with the B-side "Call", and the Japanese version of "My Pace" as a bonus track from the first press limited editions. "Scars" was pre-released to digital music and streaming platform on October 6. Stray Kids released the Korean version of "Scars" as a lead single of the compilation album SKZ2021 on December 21.

Composition and lyrics

"Scars" is described as an "energetic" and "touching" medium number (a ballad with a bit of more tempo) song, composed in the key of C major, 80 beats per minute with a running time of 3 minutes and 21 seconds. 3Racha (Bang Chan, Changbin, Han) written and co-composed the song with Armadillo. The Japanese lyrics were written by KM-Markit. Bang Chan and Versachoi are in charge of arrangement. Lyrically, the song expresses Stray Kids' determination to continue making deep and large scars to grasp a bigger dream even though they already have a lot of them. It compares scars to the group's effort, tears and sweat. The B-side "Call" is a pop song about a still lingering feeling of love.

Commercial performance

In Japan's Oricon charts, "Scars" landed at number 32 on the Combined Singles Chart dated October 18. before combined with "Thunderous" (Japanese ver.) and peaked at number two in next week. The double A-side single with the Japanese version of "Thunderous" debuted at number 2 on the Oricon Singles Chart dated October 25, selling 119,963 copies in the first week, surpassing 37,157 copies of "Top" (Japanese ver.). For Billboard Japan Hot 100, "Scars" entered at number 39 for the dated issue of October 13, before peaked at number 2 of October 20 due to the CD single release, behide only Sakurazaka46's "Nagaredama". The single was sold 182,405 CD copies (number two on the Top Singles Sales) in the first week, surpassing 49,329 copies of their first Japanese single, 1,402 download units (number 46 on the Download Songs), and earned 3,980,778 Japan streams (number 46 on the Streaming Songs) on the week.

For international charts, "Scars" landed at number 7 on the Billboard World Digital Song Sales in the week ending October 16, 2021, making Stray Kids' fifteenth top ten song on the chart, and entered 40th week of Hungary's Single Top 40 at number 11.

Music video

An accompanying music video of "Scars" was premiered on October 6, 2021. It depicts the group journeying into a mysterious land and following a sparkle of fireflies that lead the group towards a giant box of light. The music video also features scenes of the group's sleek and powerful choreography.

Live performance

Stray Kids made a debut performance of "Scars" on October 12 at NHK E's Numa ni Hamatte Kiite Mita as well as Nippon TV's Music Blood, alongside 2PM's "Again & Again"'s cover on October 15, and Fuji TV's Love Music on October 24. The group performed "Scars" at the Japanese YouTube channel program The First Take on November 10, after performed "Mixtape: Oh" on October 29. The Korean version was performed for the first time at the group's second fan meeting 2nd #LoveStay 'SKZ's Chocolate Factory', which was held on February 12–13 at Olympic Hall.

Track listing

Notes

  In first press limited edition B, "Thunderous" (Japanese version) is switched to be the first track, and "Scars" to be the second track.
  Signifies an additional lyricist
 "Call" is stylized in all caps

Credits and personnel

Credits adapted from CD single liner notes.

Locations
 Published by Sony Music Publishing (Japan) Inc., JYP Publishing (KOMCA)
 Recorded and mixed at JYPE Studios
 Mastered at 821 Sound Mastering

Personnel

 Stray Kids – lead vocals
 Bang Chan (3Racha) – lyrics, background vocals, composition, arrangement, computer programming, digital editing
 Changbin (3Racha) – lyrics, background vocals, composition
 Han (3Racha) – lyrics, background vocals, composition
 Felix – background vocals
 Seungmin – background vocals
 KM-Markit – Japanese lyrics
 Armadillo – composition
 Versachoi – arrangement, computer programming
 Choi Hye-jin – recording
 Lee Tae-sub – mixing
 Kwon Nam-woo – mastering

"Call"

 Stray Kids – lead vocals
 Han (3Racha) – lyrics, background vocals, composition
 Bang Chan (3Racha) – lyrics, background vocals, composition, arrangement, computer programming, digital editing
 KM-Markit – Japanese lyrics
 Choi Hye-jin – recording
 Lim Hong-jin – mixing
 Kwon Nam-woo – mastering

Charts

Weekly charts

Monthly charts

Year-end charts

Certifications and sales

Release history

References

External links
  

2021 singles
2021 songs
Japanese-language songs
JYP Entertainment singles
Sony Music Entertainment Japan singles
Stray Kids songs